Major-General Sir Peter Aldcroft Downward  (10 April 1924 – 18 October 2014) was a British Army officer.

Military career
Educated at King William's College, Downward was commissioned into the South Lancashire Regiment in 1943 and served in North West Europe during the Second World War. He also took part in the Berlin Airlift in 1949 and later saw action in the Korean War. He became commanding officer of the 1st Battalion the Lancashire Regiment in 1966 and in that role was deployed to Aden during the Aden Emergency. He went on to be commander of the Berlin Infantry Brigade in 1971, commandant of the School of Infantry in 1974 and General Officer Commanding West Midlands District in 1976 before retiring in 1979.

In 1953 he married Hilda Hinckley Wood; they had two sons. Following the death of his first wife, he married Mary Boykett Proctor (née Allwork).

In retirement he was Lieutenant Governor of the Royal Hospital Chelsea, and then Governor of the Military Knights of Windsor. He died on 18 October 2014.

References

 

1924 births
British Army personnel of World War II
2014 deaths
British Army major generals
Knights Commander of the Royal Victorian Order
Companions of the Order of the Bath
Companions of the Distinguished Service Order
Recipients of the Distinguished Flying Cross (United Kingdom)
South Lancashire Regiment officers
Lancashire Regiment officers